The  District Council of Lucindale was a local government area in the Australian state of South Australia that existed from 1878 to 1998 on land in the state’s south-east.

It was proclaimed on 28 February 1878 with its seat being located in the town of  Lucindale.

At establishment, it consisted of the whole of the Hundred of Joyce.  By 1985, the district's extent had grown by the addition of the following six hundreds - Coles, Conmurra, Fox, Spence, Townsend and Woolumbool.  As of 1985, the population of each hundred was represented by a ward  whose boundary aligned with the respective hundred, with an eighth ward representing the population of the Town of Lucindale.

On 1 December 1998, it was  amalgamated with the District Council of Naracoorte to create the Naracoorte Lucindale Council.

Chairmen

The following persons were elected to serve as chairman of the council for the following terms:  

J.McCallum (1878-?)
G. Copping (? - ?)
A. Robson (? - ?) 
E. Hall (? - ?)
S. Tavender (? - ?)
E. Feurheerdt (? - ?)
D. Findlater (? - ?)
P.J. Burke (? - 1923)
Aitchison Grieve (1923-49)
Ratcliffe George Nosworthy (1949-52)
Geoffrey Trafford Cowan (1952-57)
Peter William Robertson Daw (1957-63)
Horace William Mason (1963-77)
Kenneth Ralph James OAM (1977-85)

References

Lucindale